Curse of the Golden Flower is a 2006 Chinese epic wuxia drama film written and directed by Zhang Yimou. The Mandarin Chinese title of the movie is taken from the last line of the Qi dynasty poem written by the rebel leader Huang Chao who had revolted against the Tang dynasty.

With a budget of US$45 million, it was at the time of its release the most expensive Chinese film to date, surpassing Chen Kaige's The Promise. It was chosen as China's entry for the Academy Award for Best Foreign Language Film for the year 2006, but did not receive the nomination. The film was nominated for Costume Design. In 2007 it received fourteen nominations at the 26th Hong Kong Film Awards and won Best Actress for Gong Li, Best Art Direction, Best Costume and Make Up Design and Best Original Film Song for "菊花台" (Chrysanthemum Terrace) by Jay Chou.

The plot is based on Cao Yu's 1934 play Thunderstorm (雷雨 pinyin: Léiyǔ), but is set in the Imperial court in ancient China.

Plot

On the eve of the Double Ninth Festival, the Emperor (Chow Yun-fat) and the second of his three sons, Prince Jai (Jay Chou), return from their military campaign to Nanjing so they can celebrate the holiday with their family. However, the Empress has been in an affair with the first son, Crown Prince Wan (Liu Ye), who was born of the Emperor's previous wife. At the same time, Crown Prince Wan has been in an affair with Jiang Chan (Li Man), daughter of the Imperial Doctor, and is keen on rejecting the throne so that he may run away with her.

Prince Jai notices the declining health of his mother, and is confused by her sudden interest in chrysanthemums, the golden flowers. The Empress explains that the tea she drinks has been poisoned for some time by the Emperor, but that she is planning a rebellion to overthrow him. Prince Jai agrees to be the leader of the rebellion. The Empress hires a mysterious woman to discover the type of poison which she is suffering from, but the woman is captured by Crown Prince Wan and taken to the Emperor. As it happens, the woman is Jiang Shi (Chen Jin), the Imperial Doctor's wife, whom the Emperor imprisoned a while ago and who was believed dead, but somehow escaped. The Emperor decides to pardon her and to promote the Imperial Doctor to governor of Suzhou. When Crown Prince Wan meets with Jiang Chan to say goodbye, she informs him that the Empress has woven 10,000 scarves with golden flower sigils. Crown Prince Wan confronts the Empress, and when she admits to planning a rebellion, he is anguished, and tries to kill himself, but survives.

On the way to Suzhou, the Imperial Doctor's household is betrayed and attacked by the Emperor's assassins, resulting in his death. Jiang Shi and Jiang Chan run back to Nanjing and confront the Emperor, who refuses to answer, whereupon the Empress explains to Jiang Chan that Jiang Shi was the Emperor's first wife and Crown Prince Wan's mother, meaning that Jiang Chan and Crown Prince Wan are half-brother and sister. Jiang Chan is horrified by this news and runs from the palace. Jiang Shi chases after her, whereupon both are murdered by more assassins. At this point, the third son, Prince Yu, suddenly murders Crown Prince Wan and reveals he has been aware of the corruption of both the Emperor and the Empress. Summoning a group of his own soldiers, Prince Yu demands the Emperor abdicate and offer him the throne. However, more of the Emperor's assassins descend from the ceiling and easily defeat Prince Yu's soldiers. The Emperor proceeds to whip Prince Yu to death using his belt.

Meanwhile, the outer square of the palace is assaulted by 10,000 soldiers wearing gold flower sigils, with Prince Jai in the lead. They overpower the assassins and proceed to the inner square of the palace, trampling upon the bed of golden flowers arranged for the ceremony. However, thousands of soldiers, the reserve army of the Emperor, appear and slaughter the golden soldiers; only Prince Jai survives, and he is taken captive. Behind him, the courtyard is cleaned with mechanical efficiency by a legion of servants, with bodies being removed, floors being scrubbed and laid with carpets, and pots of yellow flowers being replaced, making it seem as if the entire rebellion never even happened. At midnight, the Double Ninth Festival begins as scheduled. At the table, the Emperor expresses disappointment with Prince Jai, saying that he was already planning to give him the throne. Prince Jai says that he did not rebel to obtain the throne, but for his mother's sake. The Emperor responds by offering to pardon Prince Jai if he cooperates in the Empress's poisoning. Prince Jai refuses and kills himself, and as he does so, his blood spills into another cup of poisoned tea that has been brought to the Empress, turning the tea red.  Horrified, the Empress slaps the tea away, and the liquid is shown to corrode the table's wood, along with the golden flower image engraved into the wood.

Cast

Imperial family
 Chow Yun-fat as Emperor Ping (大王 Dàwáng "King")
 Gong Li as Empress Phoenix (王后 Wánghòu "Queen")
 Jay Chou as Prince Jai (Prince Yuanjie (王子元杰 Wángzǐ Yuánjié)), the middle son of Emperor Ping
 Qin Junjie as Prince Yu (Prince Yuancheng (王子元成 Wángzǐ Yuánchéng)), the youngest son of Emperor Ping
 Liu Ye as Crown Prince Wan (Crown Prince Yuanxiang (太子元祥 Tàizǐ Yuánxiáng)), the eldest son of Emperor Ping

Physician Jiang's family
 Ni Dahong as Imperial Physician Jiang (蒋太医 Jiǎng-tàiyī), later Governor of Xuju and Commander of Chariots
 Chen Jin as physician's wife (Mrs. Jiang (蒋氏 Jiǎng-shì))
 Li Man as Jiang Chan (蔣嬋 Jiǎng Chán, physician's daughter)

Title
The Chinese title of the movie is taken from the last line of a poem written by the rebel leader Huang Chao who was also the Emperor of self-proclaimed Qi Dynasty that was at war with the Tang Dynasty. Huang Chao had composed the poem "On the Chrysanthemum, after failing the Imperial Examination" (不第後賦菊/不第后赋菊) or simply "Chrysanthemum": 

Due to the film's high-profile while it was still in production, its title, which can be literally translated as "The Whole City is Clothed in Golden Armor", became a colorful metaphor for spring 2006 sandstorms in Beijing and the term "golden armor" (黄金甲, huángjīnjiǎ) has since become a metaphor for sandstorms among the locals.

Historical perspective

The screenplay is based on Thunderstorm, a renowned Chinese play written by Cao Yu in the 1930s. The plot could also be possibly based on Hamlet according to James Berardinelli.

The two protagonists are known in the Chinese version as "King" and "Queen", which in the English version has been upgraded to "Emperor" and "Empress". The distinction is not trivial, as the lower title "king" only lays claim to a defined region whereas the supreme "emperor" claims overlordship over the entire (Chinese-speaking) world. The choice of title therefore implies that despite the splendour of its court the polity depicted in the film does not actually rule all of China.

The English language version states that this movie is set in the "Tang dynasty" in the year 928. The Chinese version doesn't specify a time period. The film's published screenplay indicates it is set during Later Shu of the Five Dynasties and Ten Kingdoms period. Neither the Tang dynasty (618–907) nor Later Shu (934–965) existed in the year 928, although another state named Tang — known as Later Tang in history — did, as well as other Chinese states Wu, Chu, Min, Southern Han, Jingnan and Wuyue, in addition to the Khitan-ruled Liao dynasty (known as just Khitan in 928). However, Later Tang rulers were known as "Emperor" (皇帝) and never "King" (大王), and of all the states mentioned above, only Chu, Wuyue, Min and Jingnan rulers could be called "King" by their subjects in 928.

Suzhou is evidently under the jurisdiction of the state featured in the film, as the King is able to appoint Dr. Jiang its governor. This narrows the number of candidates to the states with territory in the Yangzi River Delta.

Reception

The US release garnered a generally positive reception. 
It has grossed over $78 million worldwide. It was also the third highest grossing non-English language film in 2006 after Apocalypto and Pan's Labyrinth.

Richard Corliss of Time magazine praised the film's lurid operatic aspect: "this is high, and high-wire, melodrama...where matters of love and death are played at a perfect fever pitch. And grand this Golden Flower is." Jeannette Catsoulis of The New York Times states: "In Curse of the Golden Flower Mr. Zhang achieves a kind of operatic delirium, opening the floodgates of image and melodrama until the line between tragedy and black comedy is all but erased." Kevin Thomas of the Los Angeles Times described the film as: "A period spectacle, steeped in awesome splendor and lethal palace intrigue, it climaxes in a stupendous battle scene and epic tragedy" and "director Zhang Yimou's lavish epic celebrates the gifts of actress Gong Li while weaving a timeless tale of intrigue, corruption and tragedy." Andrew O'Hehir of Salon said: "the morbid grandiosity of Curse of the Golden Flower is its own distinctive accomplishment, another remarkable chapter in the career of Asia's most important living filmmaker."

Stephen Hunter of The Washington Post wrote: "Zhang Yimou's Curse of the Golden Flower is a kind of feast, an over-the-top, all-stops-pulled-out lollapalooza that means to play kitschy and grand at once" and Hunter further states: "It's just a great old wild ride at the movies."

Matt Brunson of Creative Loafing felt that the film was a poor reflection of director Zhang Yimou's acclaimed previous works. Bruce Westbrook of The Houston Chronicle though praising the film's spectacular visuals, stated "Visuals alone can't make a story soar, and too often this one becomes bogged down by spectacle..." Kirk Honeycutt of The Hollywood Reporter wrote the film is "A disappointing misfire from a great director." Gene Seymour of Newsweek said: "Curse of the Golden Flower is to the feudal costumed adventure what Nicholas Ray's Johnny Guitar is to the Western. Both bend their genres to the extremes of operatic grandeur with such force as to pull up just below the level of High Camp." However Seymour wrote that the film was overly melodramatic and ludicrous to absorb.

The film received a score of 70 out of 100 from 32 film critics according to the review aggregator Metacritic, indicating "generally favorable reviews" and holds an average rating of 65% by 127 film critics on the review ranking site Rotten Tomatoes, and an average rating of 6.42/10. The website's critical consensus states, "Melodrama, swordplay, and CG armies -- fans of martial arts epic will get what they bargain for, though the baroque art direction can be both mesmerizing and exhaustively excessive".

Soundtrack
Besides starring in the film, Jay Chou has also recorded two songs to accompany the film, one titled "Chrysanthemum Terrace", released on his seventh studio album Still Fantasy and one included in his Curse of the Golden Flower (EP). The EP includes his song "Golden Armor".

Awards and nominations
Curse of the Golden Flower won four awards out of 14 nominations from the 26th Hong Kong Film Awards in 2007.

See also 

 List of most expensive non-English-language films

References

External links
 
 
 
 
 Curse of the Golden Flower at LoveHKFilm.com
 Curse of the Golden Flower at MonkeyPeaches
 Official Website
 Official Chinese Website (Man cheng jin dai huang jin jia)
 UK DVD review at DVD Reviewer
 Curse of the Golden Flower (2006) at Box Office Mojo

2006 films
Films set in the Five Dynasties and Ten Kingdoms period
Chinese epic films
Films directed by Zhang Yimou
Incest in film
2006 romantic drama films
Sony Pictures Classics films
Universal Pictures films
Wuxia films
Films scored by Shigeru Umebayashi
Chinese romantic drama films
Chinese historical films